Joe Royal may refer to:

Joe Royal (rugby union) (born 1985), New Zealand rugby player
Joe Royal (baseball) (1912–1975), American baseball player

See also
Joe Royle (born 1949), English football manager